The 2008 Angola Basketball Super Cup (15th edition) was contested by Petro Atlético, as the 2007 league champion and Primeiro de Agosto, the 2007 cup runner-up. Primeiro de Agosto was the winner, making it its 7th title.

The 2008 Women's Super Cup (13th edition) was contested by Interclube, as the 2007 women's league champion and Primeiro de Agosto, the 2007 cup winner. Primeiro de Agosto was the winner, making it its 2nd title.

2008 Men's Super Cup

2008 Women's Super Cup

See also
 2008 Angola Basketball Cup
 2008 BAI Basket

References

Angola Basketball Super Cup seasons
Super Cup